Protasovo, in western media also given as Ryazan Alexandrovo or Aleksandrovo, was an air base in Ryazan Oblast, Russia located  southeast of Ryazan.

Before 1992 it was home to the Ryazan Training Centre, a DOSAAF training unit, flying the L-29. After the 1992 military reforms, the unit was disbanded, and the airbase became home to the 865th Helicopter Reserve Base, a storage and dismantling unit, handling Mi-8 and Mi-24 helicopters of the Russian Air Force. However, Google Earth high-resolution images from 2004 and 2005 show the airfield was vacated with no aircraft present, probably meaning all helicopters had been scrapped by then.

Currently the Ryazan Aeroclub is based on the airfield.

Sources

https://archive.today/20080110072449/http://www8.brinkster.com/vad777/russia/air/va/16va_mvo.htm - accessed January 2007

Soviet Air Force bases
Soviet Frontal Aviation
Russian Air Force bases
Ryazan Oblast